The siege of Jaén was the final siege on the city during the Spanish Reconquista. The siege, was carried out from 1245 through 28 February 1246 by forces of the Kingdom of Castile and the Order of Santiago commanded by Ferdinand III of Castile and the Grand Master of the Order of Santiago, Pelayo Pérez Correa, against a combined defending force of the local Taifa of Jaén (جيان) and the Emirate of Granada under Muhammad I. The battle resulted in a Castilian victory with the city of Jaén being handed over to the Kingdom of Castile and Leon after the signing of the Treaty of Jaén.

Context 

After two previous attempts to capture Jaén, first in 1225 and another in 1230, Ferdinand III of Castile decided on another attempt to besiege the city having consolidated his power over the thrones of Castile and León and not having been decisively beaten in either of his previous attempts on the city. He was supported in this new campaign by Pelayo Pérez Correa, the Grand Master of the Order of Santiago. Throughout the winter of 1245, the forces of Castile launched raids on the areas surrounding the city in preparation for an eventual siege, capturing strategic points in the surrounding areas.

The siege 

At the start of the siege, the Castilian forces began launching attacks on the various city gates, all of which were ineffective in terms of capturing any points on the main wall, however they did in many instances manage to drive the defenders off the bulwarks of the outer defenses.

Contemporary chronicles also recount ambushes and sallies out of the city by Granadan and Jayyānese forces. One such sally by a group of seven Moorish knights managed to capture a Castilian resupply caravan, obliging the Castilian forces to pursue the raiders. A force led by Don Alvar Gil de Villalobos was obliged to give chase in an attempt to rescue their captured supply train; however the Moorish knights fled, leading the Castilian rescue party into an ambush by some 50 more knights and around 100 infantry soldiers.

Consequences 

On 28 February 1246, in an attempt to consolidate power over his dominions, Muhammad I, King of Granada, ordered the surrender of Jaén to Castilian forces in accordance with his signing of the Treaty of Jaén which effectively turned the Emirate of Granada into a vassal state of the Kingdom of Castile.

See also 

 Jaén, Spain
 List of Castilian Battles
 Ferdinand III of Castile

References

Bibliography 

 

 

 

 

 

 

1245 in Europe
Conflicts in 1245
Conflicts in 1246
13th century in Al-Andalus
Jaen 1245
Jaen (1245)
Jaen
Jaen 1245
Jaén, Spain
1246 in Europe
Jaen 1245
13th century in Castile